Bely (masculine) or Belaya (feminine) is a Russian last name meaning "white". It is shared by the following people:
Aleksey Bely (born 1961), Ukrainian politician
Andrei Bely (1880–1934), pseudonym of Boris Bugayev, a Russian novelist, poet, and literary critic
Mikhail Bely, Russian diplomat, Russian ambassador to Japan
Viktor Bely (1904–1983), Russian composer and social activist

See also
Belyi

Russian-language surnames